Caesar Garcia (born November 13, 1981) is an American diver. He competed at the 2004 Summer Olympics in Athens, in the men's 10 metre platform.

References

1981 births
Living people
American male divers
Olympic divers of the United States
Divers at the 2004 Summer Olympics
21st-century American people